Plagiobothrys stipitatus is a species of flowering plant in the borage family known by the common name stalked popcornflower and stipitate forget-me-not. It is native to Oregon and most of California, where it grows in vernal pools and similar wet habitat types. It is an annual herb producing a narrow, hollow, erect stem up to half a meter tall. It is coated in rough hairs. The pointed, hairy leaves along the stem are up to 11 centimeters long. The inflorescence is a series of five-lobed white flowers 2 millimeters to over one centimeter wide. The fruit is a narrow, ribbed nutlet.

References

External links
Jepson Manual Treatment
Photo gallery

stipitatus
Flora of California
Flora of Oregon
Flora without expected TNC conservation status